Tanuja Samarth, known mononymously as Tanuja, is an Indian actress who predominantly works in the Hindi film industry. Part of the Mukherjee-Samarth family, she is the daughter of actress Shobhna Samarth and producer Kumarsen Samarth, and was married to filmmaker Shomu Mukherjee, with whom she has two daughters, actresses Kajol and Tanisha. A recipient of two Filmfare Awards, Tanuja is best known for her roles in the Hindi and Bengali films like  Memdidi (1961), Deya Neya (1963), Chand Aur Suraj (1965), Baharen Phir Bhi Aayengi (1966), Jewel Thief (1967), Nai Roshni (1967), Antony Firingee (film) (1967), Pratham Kadam Phool (1969), Teen Bhubaner Pare (1969), Jeene Ki Raah (1969), Rajkumari (1970), Haathi Mere Saathi (1971), Anubhav (1971), Mere Jeevan Saathi (1972) and Do Chor (1972). Her pairings with actors Sanjeev Kumar, Rajesh Khanna, Dharmendra and Uttam Kumar were popular in the late 1960s and early 1970s.

Personal life

Tanuja was born in a Marathi family to filmmaker Kumarsen Samarth and actress Shobhna Samarth. She has three sisters, including actress Nutan and one brother. Her grandmother, Rattan Bai, and cousin Nalini Jaywant were also actresses. Tanuja's parents parted amicably while she was still a child, and Shobhana became linked to actor Motilal. Shobhana produced debut films for Tanuja and her older sister, Nutan. Her two other sisters are; Chatura, an artist, and Reshma, and her brother is Jaideep, none of whom took to acting.

Tanuja married filmmaker Shomu Mukherjee in 1973. The couple has two daughters, actresses Kajol and Tanisha. Kajol is married to actor Ajay Devgan. Shomu died on 10 April 2008 from a heart attack, aged 64. Filmmakers Joy, Deb and Ram are her brothers-in-law. She is the aunt of actors Mohnish Behl, Rani, and Sharbani, and director Ayan Mukherjee.

Career
She started her film career with her older sister Nutan in Hamari Beti (1950) as Baby Tanuja. As an adult, she debuted in the film Chhabili (1960) which was directed by her mother, and had her sister Nutan, in the lead. The film that truly marked her transition to adult heroine was Hamari Yaad Aayegi (1961), directed by Kidar Sharma, who had earlier discovered Raj Kapoor, Madhubala and Geeta Bali.

One of her early films noted for her acting was Baharen Phir Bhi Aayengi (1966), directed by Shaheed Latif. Incidentally it was Guru Dutt team's last offering, especially visible in the song "Woh hanske mile humse" (believed to have been picturised while Guru Dutt was still alive) who worked hard to help her "tone down" her performance. The result was that the natural, spontaneous performer gave a highly restrained performance, which became the highlight of the film — as well of her career — as she moved to lead roles soon after. Tanuja had an important supporting role in the hit film Jewel Thief. Her Next big film was Izzat (1968 film) with Dharmendra. Her next big film was with Jeetendra; Jeene Ki Raah (1969), an immediate and surprise hit. In the same year, Tanuja won the Best Supporting Actress at Filmfare for Paisa Ya Pyar. After the success of Haathi Mere Saathi (1971), she acted in Door Ka Raahi, Mere Jeevan Saathi, Do Chor and Ek Baar Mooskura Do (1972), Kaam Chor, Yaarana, Khuddar, and Masoom. Some of the other films she has acted in are Pavitra Paapi, Bhoot Bangla, and Anubhav. Some of her Marathi films are Zaakol, Unad Maina and Pitruroon.

During the mid 1960s, Tanuja started a parallel career in Bengali movies in Kolkata, starting with Deya Neya (1963), where she was paired opposite Uttam Kumar. She followed it up with Anthony-Firingee (1967) and Rajkumari (1970). Tanuja had on-screen chemistry with Soumitra Chatterjee, with whom she made some films such as Teen Bhuvaner Parey (1969) and Prothom Kadam Phool. Tanuja spoke her own lines in these Bengali films.

Afterwards, Tanuja retired from films for a number of years, but came back when her marriage ended. She was now offered supporting roles often starring former heroes. Her Pyar Ki Kahani hero Amitabh Bachchan had to call her "bhabhi" (sister-in-law) in Khuddar (1982). She also played a supporting role in Raj Kapoor's Prem Rog (1982). In 1986, he received an invitation from Sri Lanka to appear in the Sinhalese film Peralikarayo opposite to Vijaya Kumaratunga where she played the main role.

She then appeared in films such as Saathiya (2002), Rules: Pyaar Ka Superhit Formula (2003), and Khakee (2003) as a supporting actress. In 2008, Tanuja starred as a judge along with her daughter, Kajol, and son-in-law, Ajay Devgan on Zee TV's family dance series Rock-N-Roll Family. In 2013, Tanuja played a widow in the Marathi film Pitruroon made by Nitish Bharadwaj. For her role as a widow Tanuja has tonsured her head to make her character look authentic.

Awards and nominations
1964: Bengal Film Journalists Association Awards - Best Supporting Actress (Hindi), Benazir (1964)
1968 - Filmfare nomination as Best Supporting Actress for Jewel Thief
1970 - Filmfare Award for Best Supporting Actress for Paisa Ya Pyaar
2013 - Best Actress Award for Marathi Movie Pitruroon at the 20th Life OK Screen Awards
2014 - Lifetime Achievement Honour at Apsara Film & Television Producers Guild Award
2014 - Filmfare Lifetime Achievement Award

Filmography

Modern Love: Mumbai (2022)
Shonar Pahar (2018)
Aarambh: Kahaani Devsena Ki (or simply, Aarambh; 2017)
A Death in the Gunj (2016)
Pitruroon (2013) (Marathi Movie)
Son of Sardaar (2012)
Toonpur Ka Superrhero (2010)
Naa Anevaadu (2008)
Deewaar (2004)
Khakee (2004)
Bhoot (2003)
Manemagalu (2003)
Rules: Pyaar Ka Superhit Formula (2003)
Saathiya (2002)
Tum Jiyo Hazaron Saal (2002)
Safari (1999)
Muqadama (1996)
Aatish: Feel the Fire (or just Aatish; 1994)
Vivekananda (1994)
Antim Nyay (1993)
Izzat Ki Roti (1993)
Paruvu Prathista (1993)
Bekhudi (1992)
Deedar (1992)
Abhi Abhi (1992)
Gajab Tamaasa (1992)
Andha Bichar (1990)
Dushman (1990)
Shandaar (1990)
Gharana (1989)
Meri Zabaan (1989)
Paraya Ghar (1989)
Rakhwala (1989)
Taaqatwar (1989)
Unad Maina (1988) (Marathi film)
Agnee (1988)
Madhuban (1988)
Mera Muqaddar (1988)
Paap Ko Jalaa Kar Raakh Kar Doonga (1988)
Diljalaa (1987)
Mard Ki Zabaan (1987)
Peralikarayo  (1986) ( Sinhala movie)
Ek Aur Sikander (1986)
Adhikar (1986)
Anokha Rishta (1986)
Ek Main Aur Ek Tu (1986)
Jaal (1986)
Love 86 (1986) Govinda, Neelam Kothari
Maa Beti (1986) Shashi Kapoor, Sharmila Tagore
Mohabbat Ki Kasam (1986)
Nasihat (1986)
Suhagan (1986)
Ghar Dwaar (1985)
Hoshiyar (1985)
Lover Boy (1985)
Sohni Mahiwal (1985)
Zabardast (1985)
Gulchhadi (1984) Marathi film
Shilalipi (1984)
Boxer (1984)
Maati Maangey Khoon (1984)
Pet Pyar Aur Paap (1984)
Yaadgaar (1984)
Ek Jaan Hain Hum (1983)
Johny I Love You (1982)
Ucha Dar Babe Nanak Da (1982)
Kaamchor (1982)
Khud-Daar (1982)
Masoom (1983)
Prem Rog (1982)
Adalat o Ekti Meye (1981)
Commander (1981)
Yaarana (1981)
Zaakol (1980) Marathi film
Bandish (1980)
Thaliritta Kinakkal(1980) - Malayalam film
Lal Kothi (1978)
Swarg Narak (1978)
Simana Periye (1977)
Hamrahi (1974)
Amir Garib (1974)
Humshakal (1974)
Imtihan (1974)
Insaaf (1973)
Aparna (1972)
Do Chor (1972)
Ek Baar Muskura Do (1972)
Mere Jeevan Saathi (1972)
Mome Ki Gudiya (1972)
Anubhav (1971)
Door Ka Raahi (1971)
Ek Paheli (1971)
Haathi Mere Saathi (1971)
Preet Ki Dori (1971)
Pyar Ki Kahani (1971)
Bachpan (1970)
Pratham Kadam Phool (1970)
Priya (1970)
Rajkumari (1970)
Pavitra Paapi (1969) 
Gustakhi Maaf (1969)
Jeene Ki Raah (1969)
Paisa Ya Pyaar (1969)
Oos Raat Ke Baad (1969)
Teen Bhubaner Pare (1969)
Do Dooni Chaar (1968)
Izzat (1968)
Juaari (1968)
Sapnon Ka Saudagar (1968)
Dustu Projapoti (1967)
Anthony Firingee (1967)
Jewel Thief (1967)
Nai Roshni
Baharen Phir Bhi Aayengi (1966)
Daadi Maa (1966)
Bhoot Bungla (1965)
Nai Umar Ki Nai Fasal (1965)
Chand Aur Suraj (1965)
Benazir (1964)
Aaj Aur Kal (1963)
Deya Neya (1963)
Mem-Didi (1961)
Hamari Yaad Aayegi (1961)
Chhabili (1960)
Amber (1952)
Hamari Beti (1950)

Television

Aarambh (2017)
Junoon (1994)
Khandaan (1985)

References

External links

 
 
 Sparkling spitfire: Tanuja Dinesh Raheja's profile on Tanuja, Rediff.com

Living people
Actresses from Mumbai
Marathi people
Indian film actresses
Filmfare Awards winners
Filmfare Lifetime Achievement Award winners
Actresses in Hindi cinema
Child actresses in Hindi cinema
Actresses in Malayalam cinema
Indian child actresses
20th-century Indian actresses
21st-century Indian actresses
1943 births